Michael Boulware (born September 17, 1981) is a former American football safety in the National Football League (NFL). He was drafted by the Seattle Seahawks in the second round of the 2004 NFL Draft and also played for the Houston Texans. He played college football at Florida State.

Boulware's older brother Peter Boulware also played in the NFL.

Early years
Mikey graduated 2000 as South Carolina's Gatorade Player of the Year...a versatile athlete who can play both offense and defense...expected to play wide receiver at Florida State...caught 56 passes for 1,028 yards and 11 touchdowns and rushed 31 times for 362 yards and three touchdowns on offense as a senior at Spring Valley....as a linebacker, cornerback and safety during senior year he recorded 91 tackles (71 solo), had 17 tackles for loss, six sacks, one interception, three caused fumbles, one fumble recovery for a touchdown and three blocked kicks...a USA Today All-USA honorable mention selection...member of the Orlando Sentinel 's All-South team...an all-state selection in South Carolina as a senior...named High School Sporting Report's South Carolina Player of the Year...member of the South Carolina all-decade team...rated SuperPrep's No. 6 "skill athlete"...listed as the No. 12 prospect (No. 2 linebacker) in the Atlantic Region by PrepStar ...Rivals100.com's No. 33 linebacker nationally...G&W's No. 5 ACC-area prospect...selected to play in the North Carolina-South Carolina Shrine Bowl...reported speed of 4.44 in the 40...younger brother of former Seminole All-American and former Baltimore Raven All-Pro Peter Boulware...chose FSU over Clemson and Georgia Tech.

College career
At Florida State University (FSU) he started every game in 2001 at strongside linebacker, and was an All-America candidate in his senior year.

As a Freshman he was FSU's top tackler on kickoff teams; he was 21st on the team with 21 tackles. As a Sophomore he ranked 4th in the Atlantic Coast Conference and tied for the team lead with three interceptions. He led the Seminole defense in scoring with two touchdowns, and ranked 4th on the team in tackles with 81. As a Junior he started every game at strongside line-backer. He was a semifinalist for the Butkus Award, and named to the All-ACC second-team.

Professional career

Seattle Seahawks
After college, Boulware went on to play for the Seattle Seahawks defense as a part-time linebacker and strong safety. In his rookie year he had a forced fumble, a sack, fifty-three tackles and most impressively, intercepted five passes, the most interceptions for any rookie ever to play for the Seahawks (until Earl Thomas did it in 2010). The end of his second year proved to be rewarding as the Seahawks played in Super Bowl XL, in which he intercepted a pass from Ben Roethlisberger. On Wednesday, October 25, Mike Holmgren, coach of the Seattle Seahawks, announced Jordan Babineaux would replace Michael Boulware at the free safety position. Mike Holmgren said that Boulware could get his job back later in the season, which he did in the December 24 game against San Diego.

Houston Texans
On September 1, 2007, the Seahawks traded Boulware to the Houston Texans for former first-round pick Jason Babin.

Minnesota Vikings
On March 20, 2008, the Minnesota Vikings signed Boulware to a one-year contract.  On August 28, 2008, he suffered a wrist injury and was subsequently placed on IR on August 30, 2008, ending his season.

NFL statistics

Key
 GP: games played
 COMB: combined tackles
 TOTAL: total tackles
 AST: assisted tackles
 SACK: sacks
 FF: forced fumbles
 FR: fumble recoveries
 FR YDS: fumble return yards 
 INT: interceptions
 IR YDS: interception return yards
 AVG IR: average interception return
 LNG: longest interception return
 TD: interceptions returned for touchdown
 PD: passes defensed

Coaching

2015, 2017 assistant football and softball coach at Cardinal Newman High School

Family
He has a wife, Jessica who was a pitcher for the Florida State University softball team. She was named an All-American. They were married in 2004.  They have a son, Michael Jr, and a daughter, Aspen.

His nephew Tyler Wilson plays international soccer for Puerto Rico.

References

1981 births
Living people
American football safeties
Florida State Seminoles football players
Houston Texans players
Minnesota Vikings players
Seattle Seahawks players
Players of American football from Columbia, South Carolina